PB-34 Surab is a constituency of the Provincial Assembly of Balochistan.

See also
 PB-33 Nushki
 PB-35 Kalat

References

External links
 Election commission Pakistan's official website
 Awazoday.com check result
 Balochistan's Assembly official site

Constituencies of Balochistan